The 2006–07 was Dunfermline Athletic's seventh season in the Scottish Premier League. Dunfermline Athletic competed in the League Cup and the Scottish Cup. Although being relegated at the end of the season, Dunfermline qualified for the following season's UEFA Cup after playing in the Scottish Cup final against Celtic.

Results & fixtures

Pre-season

Scottish Premier League

Scottish League Cup

Scottish Cup

Player statistics

Squad
Last updated 12 December 2015

|-
|colspan="14"|Players who appeared for Dunfermline Athletic but left during the season:

|}

Goalscorers

Club statistics

League table

Results Summary

Transfers

Players in

Players out

Loan in

Loans out

References

Dunfermline Athletic F.C. seasons
Dunfermline Athletic